1125 China is a dark background asteroid from the outer regions of the asteroid belt. It was discovered on 30 October 1957, by astronomer Zhāng Yùzhé (Y. C. Chang，张钰哲) at the Chinese Purple Mountain Observatory（紫金山天文台） in Nanjing, and named in honor of the country China. Its name and number were actually taken from another asteroid that was considered a lost asteroid at the time, but was eventually rediscovered and given the new designation 3789 Zhongguo. "Zhongguo" means "China" in Chinese.

Orbit and classification 

China is a non-family asteroid of the main belt's background population when applying the hierarchical clustering method to its proper orbital elements. It orbits the Sun in the outer asteroid belt at a distance of 2.4–3.8 AU once every 5 years and 6 months (2,019 days; semi-major axis of 3.13 AU). Its orbit has an eccentricity of 0.22 and an inclination of 3° with respect to the ecliptic.

Naming 

This minor planet was named after People's Republic of China where the asteroid was discovered. The official naming citation was published by the Minor Planet Center on 31 May 1988.

Accidentally usurped designation 

While studying in Chicago in 1928, Zhang Yuzhe discovered an asteroid that was given the provisional designation , and later the number 1125. He named it "China" or "中華" (Zhōnghuá). However, this asteroid was not observed beyond its initial appearance and a precise orbit could not be calculated. In 1957, the Purple Mountain Observatory in China discovered a new asteroid, and with Zhang Yuzhe's agreement the new object  was reassigned the official designation 1125 China in place of the lost . However, in 1986, the newly discovered object  was confirmed to be a rediscovery of the original , and this object was named 3789 Zhongguo. Zhongguo is the Chinese word for China.

Physical characteristics 

China is an assumed carbonaceous C-type asteroid.

Rotation period and poles 

In February 2009, a rotational lightcurve of China was obtained from photometric observations by Kenneth T. Menzies at the Tigh Speuran Observatory  in Massachusetts, United States. Lightcurve analysis gave a well-defined rotation period of 5.367 hours with a brightness variation of 0.38 magnitude. In October 2013, Robert Stephens measured a similar period of 5.45 hours and an amplitude of 0.62 magnitude at the Center for Solar System Studies  in California.

Published in 2016, an additional lightcurve was modeled from photometric data obtained by a large international collaboration of astronomers. Modelling gave a concurring sidereal rotation period of  hours, as well as two spin axes of (132.0°, −46.0°) and (305.0°, −49.0°) in ecliptic coordinates.

Diameter and albedo 

According to the surveys carried out by the Japanese Akari satellite and the NEOWISE mission of NASA's Wide-field Infrared Survey Explorer, China measures between 21.86 and 30.49 kilometers in diameter and its surface has an albedo between 0.057 and 0.0860.

The Collaborative Asteroid Lightcurve Link assumes a standard albedo for carbonaceous asteroids of 0.057 and calculates a diameter of 26.64 kilometers based on an absolute magnitude of 11.6.

Notes

References

External links 
 Lightcurve Database Query (LCDB), at www.minorplanet.info
 Dictionary of Minor Planet Names, Google books
 Asteroids and comets rotation curves, CdR – Geneva Observatory, Raoul Behrend
 Discovery Circumstances: Numbered Minor Planets (1)-(5000) – Minor Planet Center
 
 

001125
001125
Named minor planets
19571030